Blue Tiger is a 1994 American action thriller film directed by Norberto Barba and starring Virginia Madsen, Ryo Ishibashi, and Yuji Okumoto.

Plot
Gina Hayes is a sweet and dedicated mother to her little son. One day, while shopping with him for a Halloween mask, her son is accidentally shot through the chest by a Japanese gunman who is trying to kill an opposing gang of bus operators. Gina notices that the gunman has a picture of a blue tiger tattooed on his chest. She becomes obsessed with vengeance and has an identical red tiger etched into her skin. She then tracks down the killer and plots his death. This leads her into the world of the Japanese Mafia, where she uses her sexual allure and newfound knowledge of the Japanese language to search the tattooed men for the same blue tiger bearer that killed her son.

Cast
 Virginia Madsen as Gina Hayes
 Toru Nakamura as Seiji
 Ryo Ishibashi as Gan
 Yuji Okumoto as Lieutenant Sakagami
 Harry Dean Stanton as Smith
 Francois Chau as Soya
 Michael Madsen as Gun Salesman

References

External links
 
 
 

1994 films
1994 action thriller films
American action thriller films
Japanese action thriller films
American films about revenge
Yakuza films
American films about Halloween
Films with screenplays by Joel Soisson
1990s American films
1990s Japanese films